Christoph Preuß (born 4 July 1981) is a German former professional footballer who played as a defender or defensive midfielder.

Career
Preuß was born in Gießen, Hesse, and raised in the Hessian town of Linden. He played for local side TSV Großen-Linden, before moving to Eintracht Frankfurt in the 2005–06 season.

In the 2006–07 campaign he was injured for almost the whole first half of the season. On 17 March 2007, he secured a 1–0 victory against Bayern Munich with a spectacular bicycle kick goal which earned Preuß the Goal of the Month award and finished second in the Goal of the Year poll. Later, he was plagued with injuries. After coming back from a two-year injury he appeared three times in the Bundesliga for Eintracht Frankfurt but was injured once again. On 28 January 2010, he announced his retirement from professional football.

International career
He was an under-17 national and played for all DFB youth teams up to the under-21 team.

References

External links
 
 Christoph Preuß at eintracht-archiv.de 

1981 births
Living people
Sportspeople from Giessen
German footballers
Footballers from Hesse
Association football midfielders
Bundesliga players
2. Bundesliga players
Bayer 04 Leverkusen players
VfL Bochum players
Eintracht Frankfurt players
Eintracht Frankfurt II players
Germany youth international footballers
Germany under-21 international footballers
Germany B international footballers